Evard (also Romanized as Evārd; also known as Avārd) is a village in Tuskacheshmeh Rural District, in the Central District of Galugah County, Mazandaran Province, Iran. At the 2006 census, its population was 988, in 247 families.

References 

Populated places in Galugah County